Justina Gaspar was a Mozambican politician. In 1977 she was one of the first group of women elected to the People's Assembly.

Biography
Gaspar was a FRELIMO candidate in the 1977 parliamentary elections, in which she was one of the first group of 27 women elected to the People's Assembly. She was killed on 30 March 1986 when an air force transport plane she was travelling in crashed during takeoff from an airport in Pemba airport.

References

Date of birth unknown
FRELIMO politicians
Members of the Assembly of the Republic (Mozambique)
20th-century Mozambican women politicians
20th-century Mozambican politicians
1986 deaths